Blair Hollow is a valley in Ozark County in the Ozarks of south central Missouri. The valley is a tributary to North Fork River. The head of the valley lies just northwest of U.S. Route 160. Tecumseh is about three miles to the southwest along the North Fork.

Blair Hollow has the name of the local Blair family.

References

Valleys of Ozark County, Missouri
Valleys of Missouri